The Skinny Boys are an American hip hop group, originally from Bridgeport, Connecticut. The Skinny Boys members are Shockin' Shawn (Shaun Harrison), Superman Jay (James J. Harrison), and The Human Jock Box (Jacque D. Lloyd). The Skinny Boys were influenced by the much more prominent hip hop pioneers The Fat Boys, and their single "Jock Box" was influenced by The Fat Boys' member Human Beat Box. As of September 21,2021, they have been awarded "The Key to the City" in Bridgeport, Connecticut.

The Skinny Boys started its career on the independent record label Bush, run by Rhonda Bush. Its first release was a 12-inch single "Awesome" b/w "Skinny Boys" in 1985. The New York City-based label Warlock Records signed the group in 1986. That year the label released two more of their singles, "Jockbox" and "Unity", as well as an album, Weightless. Featured on Weightless were a handful of human beatbox songs, such as "Jockbox" and "Get Funky".

The group went on to sign with Jive Records and had a two albums released by that label, namely Skinny & Proud and Skinny (They Can't Get Enough).

Workaholics theme song 
The single "Jockbox" was used as the theme song of the Comedy Central television series Workaholics.

There is a school in Japan where the 6th grade children use The Skinny Boys for "Fresh Friday".

Discography
1986: Weightless
1987: Skinny & Proud
1988: Skinny (They Can't Get Enough)

References

External links
The Skinny Boys - The Unkut Interview

American hip hop groups
East Coast hip hop groups
Musical groups from Bridgeport, Connecticut
Jive Records artists
Five percenters
American musical trios
Musical groups established in 1985
1985 establishments in Connecticut